João Vitor Brandão Figueiredo (born 27 May 1996) is a Brazilian professional footballer who plays as a forward for Turkish club İstanbul Başakşehir.

Career

OFI
On 2 August 2019, Superleague club OFI officially announced the acquisition of Figueiredo on a three-year deal for a fee of €100,000.  In 24 games in a remarkable 2019-20 season, the 23-year-old Brazilian attacker scored nine goals for OFI, with one of them being the winner against Lamia which secured their place in the championship playoffs.

On 4 July 2020, he completed an exquisite team effort and scored in a 2-2 home draw against PAOK.  He scored in the last game of the season, a 3-2 away defeat, against Panathinaikos, on 19 July 2020. 

Figueiredo, on 21 September 2020, completed his transfer in Al Wasl, signing a 3-year contract with the Dubai based team, in a €1.000.000 deal.

Moves to Turkey
On 6 June 2022, Figueiredo moved to Gaziantep on a permanent basis after playing there on loan previously and signed a three-year contract.

On 17 February 2023, following Gaziantep's withdrawal from the 2022–23 season on account of the 2023 Turkey-Syria earthquake, Figueiredo signed for İstanbul Başakşehir on a three-and-a-half year deal.

References

External links

1996 births
Footballers from São Paulo
Living people
Association football forwards
Brazilian footballers
Clube Atlético Mineiro players
FK Kauno Žalgiris players
OFI Crete F.C. players
Al-Wasl F.C. players
Gaziantep F.K. footballers
İstanbul Başakşehir F.K. players
Campeonato Brasileiro Série A players
A Lyga players
Super League Greece players
UAE Pro League players
Süper Lig players
Expatriate footballers in Lithuania
Expatriate footballers in Greece
Expatriate footballers in the United Arab Emirates
Expatriate footballers in Turkey
Brazilian expatriate sportspeople in Lithuania
Brazilian expatriate sportspeople in Greece
Brazilian expatriate sportspeople in the United Arab Emirates
Brazilian expatriate sportspeople in Turkey